Lost River Caverns is a natural limestone cavern located on the east side of Hellertown, Pennsylvania, United States, and consisting of five chambers. The caverns were formed by the karstification or dissolving of the limestone by water. In the past the caverns have been called Rentzheimer's Cave and Lost Cave.  The "Lost River", so named because the source and mouth of the river have not yet been discovered, flows through it. The temperature in the cave is consistently in the  area. There is a gift shop and a museum before the entrance. 

It was discovered in 1883 when a limestone quarry cut into it. It is currently open to the public.

References

External links 
Lost River Caverns web site

Caves of Pennsylvania
Landforms of Northampton County, Pennsylvania
Tourist attractions in Northampton County, Pennsylvania